Jorge Luis Ortiz Durán (born February 5, 1998, in Guadalajara, Jalisco) is a Mexican professional footballer who plays for U. de G.

External links
 

Living people
1998 births
Mexican footballers
Leones Negros UdeG footballers
Deportivo CAFESSA Jalisco footballers
Ascenso MX players
Liga Premier de México players
Tercera División de México players
Footballers from Guadalajara, Jalisco
Association football midfielders